Khotso Benny Malope (born 18 June 1994) is a South African soccer player who plays as a midfielder for Richards Bay.

Career
Malope was born in Benoni, Gauteng.

He spent the 2015–16 season at Moroka Swallows, before spending the 2016–17 season again on loan, this time at Thanda Royal Zulu. Malope made his debut for the club in September 2017, and he scored his first goal of the 2018–19 season for Chiefs in August 2018 against Bloemfontein Celtic as the club drew 2–2, but left the club shortly before the end of the 2018–19 season.

He joined Richards Bay in the summer of 2019.

References

Living people
1994 births
South African soccer players
People from Benoni
Association football midfielders
Kaizer Chiefs F.C. players
Moroka Swallows F.C. players
Thanda Royal Zulu F.C. players
Richards Bay F.C. players
South African Premier Division players
National First Division players
Sportspeople from Gauteng